Ignition is a 2001 action drama film written by William Davies and directed by Yves Simoneau.

Premise
NASA is about to launch a rocket to put a man on the moon, but corrupt high-ranking military officials plot to assassinate the president over budget cuts.

External links
 
 

2001 films
2001 science fiction action films
American science fiction action films
Films about computing
Films set in Washington, D.C.
Films shot in Vancouver
2001 action drama films
Films directed by Yves Simoneau
Films with screenplays by William Davies
Canadian science fiction action films
English-language Canadian films
2000s English-language films
2000s American films
2000s Canadian films